HECT, C2 and WW domain containing E3 ubiquitin protein ligase 1 is a protein that in humans is encoded by the HECW1 gene. In human it has 1606 amino acids (179.5 kDa) and isoelectric point of 5.18.

References

Further reading